Sam McCarthy (born March 15, 2002) is an American actor. He is known for his roles as Sam Barber Jr. in the Audience drama series Condor (2018) and Charlie Harding in the Netflix dark comedy series Dead to Me (2019—22). He made his film debut in All These Small Moments (2018).

Early life 
McCarthy was born on March 15, 2002, to Carol Schneider and actor Andrew McCarthy. McCarthy attended and graduated high school at The Professional Children's School in New York in 2020.

Career 
In 2016, McCarthy made his professional acting debut in the ABC drama series The Family. Following on from his first role, McCarthy went on to appear in a variety of television series, including the comedy series The Jim Gaffigan Show, the crime thriller series The Blacklist, and the drama series Condor.

McCarthy made his feature film debut in the coming-of-age drama film All These Small Moments, which premiered at the Tribeca Film Festival in April 2018.

On October 4, 2018, it was announced that McCarthy would star in the main role of Charlie Harding on the Netflix dark comedy series Dead to Me.

Filmography

Film

Television

References

External links 
 

2002 births
21st-century American male actors
American male child actors
American male film actors
American male television actors
Living people